August Johannes Kippasto (28 August 1887 – 24 September 1973 ) was an Estonian wrestler who competed for Russian Empire at the 1912 Summer Olympics in Stockholm.

He competed in the Greco-Roman lightweight competition along with two other Estonians, Georg Baumann and Oskar Kaplur, at the 1912 Summer Olympics in Stockholm, where he was eliminated after losing against Ödön Radvány and Karel Halík.

In 1929 he emigrated to Australia, where he worked as a piano tuner in Melbourne and while living in Mount Isa, and as a pupil of the great Georg Hackenschmidt, also tried his hand in professional wrestling under the name Russian Strongman Razgon (Ragozin, Ivan Razgon, Kippasto Razgon), but without success. He wrestled among others with Estonian-born Martin Bucht, former Pacific Coast Light Heavyweight Champion, Heavyweight Champion of Australia and Master of a Thousand Holds Billy Meeske. and the American heavyweight wrestler Bill Beth .

1973 he published poems collection "Mõtteid Kodust" in Sydney.

References

External links
В. Чесноков: Спортивная борьба в СССР. Справочник. Москва: Физкультура и спорт 1954 

1887 births
1973 deaths
People from Elva Parish
People from the Governorate of Livonia
Estonian male sport wrestlers
Olympic wrestlers of Russia
Wrestlers at the 1912 Summer Olympics
Russian male sport wrestlers
Estonian professional wrestlers
Estonian emigrants to Australia
Australian male professional wrestlers
Sportspeople from Sydney
Poets from Sydney
20th-century Australian poets
Australian male poets
20th-century Australian male writers